Thyrgis constrictifascia is a moth in the subfamily Arctiinae. It was described by Paul Dognin in 1919. It is found in Ecuador.

References

Natural History Museum Lepidoptera generic names catalog

Moths described in 1919
Arctiinae